Richard Watts (born 1975), is a Labour Party politician. He is currently Deputy Chief of Staff to the Mayor of London, Sadiq Khan.

He was previously Council Leader of Islington London Borough Council, England. He was elected to that role in October 2013. In the borough elections of May 2014 he led the Islington Labour Party to an increased majority on the Council.

Early life
Watts attended Haywood Comprehensive School, Nottingham. He graduated with a degree in politics from Durham University and before this worked in the Pretty Polly tights factory in Nottinghamshire.

Career
Watts has lived in Islington since 1998. He represented the ultra-safe Tollington ward in the north of Islington from the 2006 until stepping down in 2021, during which time he led the council's Labour group.

Before becoming a full-time member of Islington Council’s Executive, Watts ran the Children’s Food Campaign, a national campaign to improve children’s diets. Previously he worked for a number of different campaigns and a consultancy organisation, which led to some work in the Balkans, including working in Kosovo helping develop democratic political parties.

Watts is concerned about the effects of austerity on local government provision.  Watts stated “unprecedented” funding pressure also demand for services addressing adult and children’s social care and homelessness was “pushing councils to the limit.  As a result less money is being spent on the other services that keep our communities running such as libraries, local roads, early intervention and local welfare support.  Losing a further £1.3bn of central government funding at this time is going to tip many councils over the edge. Many local authorities will reach the point where they only have the funds to provide statutory responsibilities and it will be our local communities and economies that will suffer the consequences.”

References

1975 births
Living people
Politics of the London Borough of Islington
Labour Party (UK) councillors
Councillors in the London Borough of Islington
Alumni of Collingwood College, Durham
Leaders of local authorities of England